Daniel Parker (January 29, 1782, Shirley, Massachusetts – April 5, 1846, Washington, D.C.) made his career in the United States Department of War and the United States Army.

Biography
He was the son of Lieutenant James Parker and Sarah Dickinson. He graduated from Dartmouth College in 1801, read law, and was admitted to the bar in Charlestown, Massachusetts. He became chief clerk in the U. S. War Department in 1810. On 22 November 1814, he became adjutant general and inspector general of the U.S. Army. In 1821, he became paymaster general. In 1841 he returned to the War Department as chief clerk.

His remains were buried 7 April 1846 in the Historic Congressional Cemetery, Washington, D.C.

Notes

References

External links
 The Daniel Parker Papers, including incoming and outgoing correspondence with several presidents, are available for research use at the Historical Society of Pennsylvania.
 

1782 births
1846 deaths
Adjutants general of the United States Army
Burials at the Congressional Cemetery
Inspectors General of the United States Army
Paymaster-General of the United States Army
Dartmouth College alumni
United States Army paymasters
People from Shirley, Massachusetts
Military personnel from Massachusetts